Solotvyn is an urban-type settlement in Ivano-Frankivsk Raion of Ivano-Frankivsk Oblast, 40 km from Ivano-Frankivsk. Solotvyn hosts the administration of Solotvyn settlement hromada, one of the hromadas of Ukraine.

Solotvyn is on the Bystrytsia of Solotvyn, the left of the two long headstreams of the Bystrytsia River (a tributary of the Dniester), at the foot of the Carpathian Mountains. In the seventeenth century it was named Krasnopil.

Until 18 July 2020, Solotvyn belonged to Bohorodchany Raion. The raion was abolished in July 2020 as part of the administrative reform of Ukraine, which reduced the number of raions of Ivano-Frankivsk Oblast to six. The area of Bohorodchany Raion was merged into Ivano-Frankivsk Raion.

References

External links
 Solotvyn in Geographical Dictionary of the Kingdom of Poland and other Slavic Countries (Polish: Słownik geograficzny Królestwa Polskiego i innych krajów słowiańskich)
 Jewish history and photographs of Jewish sites in Solotvyn in Jewish History in Galicia and Bukovina
Solotvin Jewish Cemetery fully documented at Jewish Galicia and Bukovina ORG

Urban-type settlements in Ivano-Frankivsk Raion